Sachs Patera is a feature on Venus. Defined as a sag-caldera, Sachs is an elliptical depression 130 meters (81 feet) in depth, spanning  in width along its longest axis. The arc-shaped set of scarps, extending out to the north from the prominent ellipse, is evidence for a separate episode of withdrawal; the small lobe-shaped extension to the southwest may represent an additional event. The flows are a lighter tone of gray in the radar data because the lava is blockier in texture and consequently returns more radar waves. Much of the lava, which was evacuated from the chamber, probably traveled to other locations underground, while some of it may have surfaced further south. This is unlike calderas on Earth, where a rim of lava builds up in the immediate vicinity of the caldera.

Notes

References

Volcanoes of Venus